Sherman is an unincorporated community in Cherokee County, Kansas, United States.

History
A post office was opened in Sherman City in 1867, and it was renamed Sherman in 1894. The post office remained in operation until it was discontinued in 1964.

References

Further reading

External links
 Cherokee County maps: Current, Historic, KDOT

Unincorporated communities in Cherokee County, Kansas
Unincorporated communities in Kansas